Courtemaîche railway station is a railway station in the municipality of Basse-Allaine, in the Swiss canton of Jura. It is an intermediate stop on the standard gauge Delémont–Delle line of Swiss Federal Railways.

Services
The following services stop at Courtemaîche:

 RegioExpress: hourly service between Meroux or Delle and Biel/Bienne.

References

External links 
 
 

Railway stations in the canton of Jura
Swiss Federal Railways stations